Alfred Smoczyk (11 October 1928 – 26 September 1950) was an international speedway rider from Poland.

Speedway career 
Smoczyk was the first champion of Poland, winning the Polish Individual Speedway Championship in 1949.

In 1950, he was killed in a motorcycle accident in the Kąkolewski forest, near Gostyń. Later that year on 30 September, the Polish President Bolesław Bierut posthumously awarded the Officer's Cross of the Order of Polonia Restituta.

In 1951, a tournament in Leszno was named in his memory and in 1953 the Stadion im. Alfreda Smoczyka was named after him.

See also
 List of recipients of the Order of Polonia Restituta

References 

1928 births
1950 deaths
Polish speedway riders